Daybreak is a compilation album by American banjoist Béla Fleck. His next compilation, Places which was released in 1988, Fleck continued to merge his bluegrass roots with forays into other genres, which turned into his Flecktones project in the 90's.

Track listing 
All tracks written by Béla Fleck; except where noted

 "Texas Barbeque"
 "Spain" (Chick Corea)
 "Twilight"
 "Reading in the Dark"
 "Growling Old Man and the Grumbling Old Woman" (Traditional; arranged by Fleck)
 "How Can You Face Me Now" (Andy Razaf, Fats Waller)
 "Bill Cheatham" (Traditional; arranged by Fleck, Bill Keith, Tony Trischka)
 "Christina's Jig / Plain Brown Jig"
 "Silverbell" (Traditional)
 "Fiddler's Dream" (Traditional)
 "Daybreak"
 "Dawg's Due"
 "Flexibility"
 "Old Hickory Waltz"
 "Crossfire"
 "Applebutter"
 "The Natural Bridge Suite"
 "Punchdrunk"

Personnel
 Béla Fleck - banjo, guitar
 Tony Trischka, Bill Keith - banjo
 Russ Barenberg, Glenn Lawson, David Parmley - guitar
 Sam Bush, Randy Sabien - fiddle
 Mark O'Connor - fiddle, guitar, viola
 Darol Anger - fiddle, violectra
 Jerry Douglas, Stacy Philips - Dobro
 David Grisman, Jimmy Gaudreau, Jack Tottle - mandolin
 Paul Kahn, Mark Schatz - bass
 Pat Enright - vocals

References

1987 compilation albums
Béla Fleck albums
Rounder Records compilation albums